William Clay, Willie Clay, Bill Clay, or Billy Clay may refer to:

Politicians 
Bill Clay (William Lacy Clay, Sr., born 1931), politician from the state of Missouri
Lacy Clay (William Lacy Clay, Jr., born 1956), politician from the state of Missouri
Sir William Clay, 1st Baronet (1791–1869), English merchant and MP for Tower Hamlets

Sports 
William Clay (footballer) (born 1883), footballer
Willie Clay (born 1970), former American football player
Billy Clay (born 1944), American football cornerback
William Clay (cyclist) (born 1973), American track cyclist
Bill Clay (baseball) (1874–1917), American baseball player

Others 
William Clay (industrialist), early user of the Bessemer process in Liverpool
William Keatinge Clay (1797–1867), English cleric and antiquary
William D. Clay Jr., special adviser to the United Nations

See also
William Clay Ford (disambiguation)
Clay (disambiguation)